Dorothy J. Gaiter and John Brecher are American journalists, authors, and wine critics, wife and husband who jointly wrote the wine column "Tastings" in The Wall Street Journal between 1998 and 2009. They rated wines on a scale that ranged from "Yech", "OK", "Good", "Very Good", "Delicious" to "Delicious!". Their careers began simultaneously and have remained connected since their first meeting in the newsroom of The Miami Herald in 1973.

Early life
Brecher grew up in Jacksonville, Florida and graduated from Columbia University in 1973, where he served as editor-in-chief of the Columbia Daily Spectator. Gaiter grew up in an all-black community near Florida A&M University in Tallahassee, Florida.

Open That Bottle of Wine Night
In the late 1990s, Gaiter and Brecher invented the annual "Open That Bottle Night" (OTBN), encouraging their readers to open a symbolically significant bottle, and then share their stories. Since its inauguration in 2000, the event is always scheduled for the last Saturday in February, so the date may range from February 22 to 29.

Books
Among their published titles are Love by the Glass: Tasting Notes from a Marriage (2003), Wine for Every Day and Every Occasion (2004) and several editions of The Wall Street Journal Guide to Wine.

Final "Tastings" column

Gaiter and Brecher announced at the end of their December 26, 2009 "Tastings" column in The Wall Street Journal that it would be their last. No reason was given, and no hint was provided as to what the couple would do in the future. The writers who later succeeded them as The Wall Street Journal wine columnists were Jay McInerney, Lettie Teague, and Will Lyons.

In 2011, in an interview with the Jacksonville Wine Guide, Gaiter and Brecher said that they "took the year off" in 2010—their first significant break from work in 36 years—and were undecided as to their next project.

Recent accomplishments
In 2010, Gaiter was named Food and Wine Editor for France Magazine. In 2013, she was also named Senior Editor for grapecollective.com.

Brecher joined Bloomberg News in 2011 and, in 2012, was named Executive Editor for Enterprise. In May 2014, he was awarded the Lawrence Minard Award, one of two Gerald Loeb career achievement awards.

See also
 List of wine personalities

References

External links
 The Wall Street Journal: "Tastings"
 Gaiter and Brecher wine tasting video archive

Year of birth missing (living people)
Living people
American women journalists
Wine critics
American male journalists
21st-century American women
Columbia College (New York) alumni